Padmapriya Janakiraman, better known mononymously as Padmapriya, is an Indian actress and model.  She is also a trained bharatanatyam dancer. Padmapriya made her acting debut in the Telugu film Seenu Vasanthi Lakshmi in 2003.

Early life 
Padmapriya was born in Delhi to Janakiraman, a brigadier in the Indian Army, and Vijaya.

She did her schooling at Kendriya Vidyalaya, Trimulgherry, Secunderabad, Telangana  and studied at Loyola Academy, Alwal, Secunderabad, from which she graduated with a B.Com degree. Later, she pursued an MBA degree in finance at KIAMS, Harihar. She was then working for GE Capital as a risk consultant in Bangalore and Gurgaon. After GE she was with Symphony in Bangalore. During her free-time, she ventured into modelling, which would later pave her way to the film business and acting. She has also won Miss Andhra Pradesh in 2001. While studying in 12th class in Andhra Pradesh, Padmapriya did a music album.

She also holds a PG Diploma in Environmental Law from National Law School of India University and Masters in Public Administration from New York University.

Career 

Padmapriya made her acting debut in the 2003 Telugu film Seenu Vasanthi Lakshmi,a remake of the Malayalam film Vasanthiyum Lakshmiyum Pinne Njaanum. She played the role of a sexually exploited poor sister of a blind man in the film. Padmapriya says, she accepted this offer "for the sake of friendship". This made possible her entry into the Malayalam film industry in the same year, starring in the film Kaazhcha alongside Mammootty. For her portrayal of a mother of a young girl, who struggles to accommodate another child, a victim of the Gujarat earthquake, she received rave reviews and the Asianet Award for Best Female New Face of the Year.

In 2005, she acted in her first Tamil-language film, Thavamai Thavamirundhu, a drama that dealt with familial bond, depicting a father-son relationship, in which she was paired opposite actor-director Cheran. She played a simple college girl in the film, which garnered highly positive reviews and won several awards at major Indian award ceremonies, including a National Film Award (for Best Film on Family Welfare). Padmapriya herself was awarded the Filmfare Award for Best Debut Actress for her critically acclaimed performance. She next starred in the Malayalam film Rajamanikyam again alongside Mammootty. The comedy film, featuring also Rahman and Sindhu Menon, was a success.

In 2006, she appeared in 6 films. Her first release that year was Vadakkum Nathan, which Padmapriya considers as her debut film, citing: "I started taking this career seriously with that movie". She next starred in the Tamil film Pattiyal, in which she portrayed a salesgirl at a garment company. The Vishnuvardhan-directed gangster film, in which she shared screen space with Arya, Bharath and Pooja Umashankar, was a commercial and critical success, becoming one of the highest-grossing Tamil films of the year. Later that year, she acted in the Malayalam-language film Karutha Pakshikal and Yes Your Honour, which both were well appreciated by critics. Padmapriya's performance in both the films received positive reviews, particularly her portrayal as Poongodi, a street beggar, in the former fetched her rave accolades and earned her several awards including a Filmfare Best Actress Award.

In 2007, she had 7 releases, the first being Anchil Oral Arjunan. Next she starred in Veeralipattu and Satham Podathey, a Tamil film. The latter was a psychological thriller directed by Vasanth, where she enacted the role of a helpless wife, who gets kidnapped by her former husband, whom she had divorced due to his alcohol addiction.

Following Satham Podathey, she appeared in the films Naalu Pennungal in Malayalam, directed by Adoor Gopalakrishnan and Mirugam in Tamil, directed by Samy. In Naalu Pennungal, which fetched its director the National Film Award for Best Direction, she played the role of a street prostitute, whilst in Mirugam, she played a tomboyish wife to a ruffian, who behaves like an animal, for which she won the Tamil Nadu State Film Special Award for Best Actress.

In 2010, Padmapriya debuted into Hindi films by playing a bar owner in Striker, as well as into Kannada films as a human rights activist in Thamassu. She also starred in the Tamil cowboy-based film Irumbukkottai Murattu Singam as an army officer's daughter, and in the Malayalam Kutty Shrank with Mammootty. In 2011, she starred in Naayika with a performance that won critical acclaim. NDTV wrote that her "beauty and acting skills helped in portraying the role to perfection and 'young Gracy' ends as the saving 'grace' of the film". She has acted in some advertisements.

Personal life
On 12 November 2014, Padmapriya married Jasmine Shah in Mumbai. He is from Gujarat and works as the Policy Head for South Asia at Abdul Latif Jameel Poverty Action Lab, which is headquartered in Massachusetts Institute of Technology. She met him while both were pursuing their Master's from Columbia and New York University.

Filmography

Awards and nominations

National Film Awards
 2010 - Special Mention – Pazhassiraja

Tamil Nadu State Film Awards

2007 - Tamil Nadu State Film Award Special Prize – Mirugam

Kerala State Film Awards
2006 - Second Best Actress – Karutha Pakshikal
2009 - Second Best Actress – Pazhassiraja

Kerala Film Critics Awards
2006 - Best Actress - Karutha Pakshikal
2007 - Best Actress - Naalu Pennungal

Filmfare Awards South
2005 - Best Female Debut (South) – Thavamai Thavamirundhu
2006 - Best Actress – Malayalam – Karutha Pakshikal
2009 - Best Supporting Actress – Malayalam – Pazhassiraja

References

External links 

 

20th-century Indian actresses
Indian film actresses
Actresses in Tamil cinema
Actresses in Malayalam cinema
Kerala State Film Award winners
Living people
Actresses from Delhi
Actresses from Hyderabad, India
Bharatanatyam exponents
Filmfare Awards South winners
Tamil Nadu State Film Awards winners
Kendriya Vidyalaya alumni
21st-century Indian actresses
21st-century Indian dancers
Actresses in Telugu cinema
Actresses in Kannada cinema
Actresses in Bengali cinema
Actresses in Hindi cinema
Dancers from Delhi
Women artists from Delhi
21st-century Indian women artists
Special Mention (feature film) National Film Award winners
Year of birth missing (living people)